Parafield is a non-residential suburb of Adelaide approximately  to  north of the CBD. The suburb is essentially contiguous with Parafield Airport. There are airport related businesses in the terminal and hangar area of the airport, and a general commercial area in the corner of Kings and Main North Roads.

It is bordered by Main North Road to the east, Kings Road to the north and the Gawler railway line to the west, where it is served by Parafield station. To the south it abuts Mawson Lakes and Elder Smith Drive at the boundary of the airport.

Parafield Post Office opened on 1 July 1946, was renamed Parafield Airport in 1965 and closed in 1986.

See also
List of Adelaide suburbs

References

Suburbs of Adelaide